The Burgthann–Allersberg railway was a ca. 15 kilometre long Lokalbahn or branch line in Bavaria, southern Germany, that began at Burgthann on the Nuremberg–Regensburg main line.

History

Planning and Construction 
Plans to link Allersberg to the railway network at the end of the 19th century variously envisaged routes from Nuremberg, Ochenbruck or Roth, but in the end the Royal Bavarian State Railways built a branch from the Nuremberg–Regensburg railway at Burgthann. The route was finally opened on 15 December 1902.

Closure 
The Deutsche Bundesbahn decided to close the route as early as the 1970s. The dilapidated state of the bridge over the B 8 accelerated this process, so that on 2 June 1973 the last train on the Allersberger Bockl left the station of Allersberg.

The trackbed today 
After the line was dismantled, large sections of the trackbed were converted into a footpath and cycle way. The former station buildings at Pyrbaum and Allersberg are now homes. At another location, 33 years later, on 6 December 2006, the new Allersberg (Rothsee) station on the Nuremberg–Ingolstadt–Munich high-speed railway was opened.

See also
 Bavarian branch lines
 Royal Bavarian State Railways
 List of closed railway lines in Bavaria

References

Footnotes

Sources
 Ulrich Rockelmann: Spurensuche Abgebaute Strecken im Raum Nürnberg. Hofmann Verlag Nürnberg, Nürnberg 1999. .
 Manfred Bräunlein: Ludwigskanal und Eisenbahn. Verlag Ph.C.W.Schmidt, Neustadt/Aisch, Nürnberg 2003. 

Branch lines in Bavaria